Alf or Alfred Wheeler may refer to:

 Alf Wheeler (footballer, born 1910) (1910–1978), English footballer who played for Walsall, Northampton Town, Southampton and Gillingham
 Alf Wheeler (footballer, born 1922) (1922–2013), English footballer who played for Blackburn Rovers and Swindon Town
 Alfred Wheeler (composer) (1865–1949), Australian composer
 Alf Wheeler (Australian footballer) (1885–1929), Australian rules footballer
 Alfred Wheeler (cricketer) (1845–?), English cricketer
 Alfred G. Wheeler (1899–1982), American football and basketball player and coach